Brian Willoughby (born 20 September 1949) is a British guitarist. He has worked with many musicians, notably Dave Cousins and The  Strawbs, Mary Hopkin, as well as releasing solo work.

Discography
(UK releases unless stated otherwise)

Albums

Solo
Black and White (1998)
Fingers Crossed (2004)

With other artists
Old School Songs – with Dave Cousins (1979)
The Contractual Album – Monty Python (1980)
Suspended Animation (The Monks) (UK band) (Gold Album in Canada 1981)
Don't Say Goodbye  Strawbs (1987)
Ringing Down the Years Strawbs (1991)
The Bridge – with Dave Cousins (1994)
Other Voices, Too (A Trip Back to Bountiful) – Nanci Griffith (1998)
Baroque & Roll – Acoustic Strawbs (2001)
Pigg River Symphony – Cathryn Craig (2001)
I Will – with Cathryn Craig (2002)
Blue Angel – Strawbs (2003)
Full Bloom  – Acoustic Strawbs (2005) live at Natural Sound, Kitchener, Ontario, Canada (2004)
Live at the Royal Festival Hall – Mary Hopkin (2005)
Calling All Angels + Cathryn Craig (2009)
Real World + Cathryn Craig (2013)
Painting by Numbers + Mary Hopkin (2013)
In America + Cathryn Craig
St.Pancras Old Church, London + Cathryn Craig
Countless other albums as session player – 1969 – present.

Singles
"The King" – Strawbs (1979)
"That's When the Crying Starts" – Strawbs (Canada 1987)
"Let it Rain" – Strawbs (Canada 1987)
"Might as Well Be on Mars" – Strawbs (Canada 1991)
"Alice's Song" – Acoustic Strawbs (2002)
"Alice's Song" – Craig & Willoughby (2009)
"Calling All Angels" – Craig & Willoughby (2009)
"Rumours of Rain" – Folk for Peace (2013)
"Freeway To Her Dreams " - Freeway To Her Dreams  Written By Gordon Haskell 
"Whole Wide World" – Cathryn Craig & Brian Willoughby, featuring Righteous Brother Bill Medley Written By Gordon Haskell
Countless other singles as session player 1969 – present.

DVDs
 Complete Strawbs: The Chiswick House Concert (2002)
 Acoustic Strawbs Live in Toronto (2004) filmed July 12, 2003 at Hugh's room
 ''Rumours of Rain"  + Folk for Peace (2013)

References

External links
High Society website
Rumours of Rain website
Brian Willoughby at Strawbsweb
Brian Willoughby and Cathryn Craig website

1949 births
Living people
People from County Antrim
British rock guitarists
British male guitarists
Strawbs members
20th-century British guitarists
20th-century British male musicians
21st-century British guitarists
21st-century British male musicians